Gus Leishman (5 June 1911 – 24 April 1994) was an  Australian rules footballer who played with Geelong in the Victorian Football League (VFL).

Notes

External links 

1911 births
1994 deaths
Australian rules footballers from Victoria (Australia)
Geelong Football Club players